Kosta Petratos (born 1 March 1998) is an Australian professional soccer player who plays as a forward for St George City in NPL NSW.

Club career
Petratos started his youth career at the Football New South Wales National Training Centre. In 2014 he joined the FFA Centre of Excellence talent identification and player development program in Canberra, coached by Tony Vidmar, before he was signed by Perth Glory for the 2016–17 A-League season. He made 9 senior cap appearances for the Glory. Petratos signed for the Newcastle Jets for the 2017–18 A-League season to gain more game time opportunities. In 2022, Petratos departed the Jets and joined second division football club Olympias Lympion, in Cyprus.

Personal life
Petratos is of Greek ancestry, and comes from a footballing family. His father Angelo played as a defender for Sydney Olympic FC, his older brother Dimitri and younger brother Maki are also football players, while his younger sister Panagiota previously played for the Newcastle W-League team in 2021.

References

External links

Living people
1998 births
Association football forwards
Australian soccer players
Australia youth international soccer players
Australian people of Greek descent
National Premier Leagues players
A-League Men players
Perth Glory FC players
Newcastle Jets FC players
Heidelberg United FC players
Soccer players from Sydney